The 2002–03 FAW Premier Cup was the sixth season of the tournament since its founding in 1997.

Group A

Group B

Quarter finals

Semi finals

Final

References

2002-03
2002–03 in Welsh football cups